Elizabeth Joy New (born 1984) is an Australian chemist and Professor of the School of Chemistry, University of Sydney. She won the 2018 Australian Museum 3M Eureka Prize.

Early life and education 
New was born in Sydney in 1984. She represented Australia at the International Chemistry Olympiad in 2000 and 2001, winning bronze and gold medals respectively, and graduated from James Ruse Agricultural High School with a UAI of 100. She earned a bachelor's degree in chemistry at the University of Sydney in 2005, where she completed her master's degree in 2006. During her graduate studies she worked on fluorescent tags to monitor the cellular uptake and metabolism of anti-tumor complexes. New completed her doctoral studies at Durham University working with David Parker, graduating in 2010. Her work looked at the cellular behaviour of lanthanide complexes.

Research and career 
She was appointed a Royal Commission for the Exhibition of 1851 Research Fellow at the University of California, Berkeley in 2010. She worked with Christopher Chang on fluorescent sensors for copper. She was made an Australian Research Council Discovery Early Career Research Fellow in 2012, working on molecular imaging. New's group developed reversible fluorescent sensors for cellular redox environments. She provided the first examples of reversible ratiometric cytoplasmic sensing and mitochondrial sensing. They develop cobalt complexes for contrast agents in magnetic resonance imaging. The complexes can be used to monitor oxidative stress.

New was made a lecturer in 2015 and a senior lecturer in 2016. In 2017 she received the ChemComm Emerging Investigator. She was appointed Associate Professor in 2018.

Awards 
 2019 Malcolm McIntosh Prize for Physical Scientist of the Year
2018 Royal Society of New South Wales Edgeworth David Medal
 2018 3M Eureka Prize for Emerging Leader in Science
 2018 Fellow of the Royal Society of New South Wales
 2017 Royal Australian Chemical Institute Rennie Memorial Medal
 2017 Royal Australian Chemical Institute Educator of the Year Award
 2016 New South Wales Early Career Researcher of the Year
 2015 Office of Learning and Teaching Teaching Excellence Award
 2015 Young Tall Poppy Science Award
 2015 Selby Research Award
 2015 Vice-Chancellor award for Outstanding Teaching
 2014 Royal Australian Chemical Institute Nyholm Lectureship, 2014-2015
 2014 Asian Biological Inorganic Chemistry Early Career Research Award
 2011 Royal Society of Chemistry Dalton Young Researchers Award
 2005 University of Sydney The University Medal

References 

Australian chemists
Inorganic chemists
Australian women chemists
University of Sydney alumni
Alumni of Ustinov College, Durham
Academic staff of the University of Sydney
1984 births
Living people
People educated at James Ruse Agricultural High School
Fellows of the Royal Society of New South Wales